Colias lada   is a butterfly in the family Pieridae. It is found in the East Palearctic (Tibet, China).

Description
Colias lada is deep yolk-colour, with rather narrow black distal margin, the middle spot of the forewing small; female with strongly darkened hindwing, the posterior portion of the distal margin being conspicuously yellow.

Taxonomy
Accepted as a species by  Josef Grieshuber & Gerardo Lamas

References

Butterflies described in 1891
lada
Butterflies of Asia